Gordlidan (also Romanized as Gordlīdān and Gerd Līdān; also known as Bord Līdān) is a village in Donbaleh Rud-e Jonubi Rural District, Dehdez District, Izeh County, Khuzestan Province, Iran. At the 2006 census, its population was 122, in 19 families.

References 

Populated places in Izeh County